The 2018–19 Major Arena Soccer League 2 season is the second season for the league M2. The regular season started on December 1, 2018, and ended on March 16, 2019. For the second year in a row, each team played a 12-game schedule. This season, the M2 expanded from 10 to 15 teams.

Changes from 2017–18
Expansion
Arizona Lightning (Avondale)
Cuervos de Juarez (El Paso/Juarez)
New Mexico Elite (Santa Fe)
New Mexico Runners (Rio Rancho)
Rochester Lancers
Stockton Rush

Name Change
Colorado Blizzard FC to Colorado Rumble FC

On Hiatus
Arizona Impact (Glendale)

Standings
As of March 16, 2019

(Bold) Division Winner

2019 M2 Championship
The team with the best record gets a bye in the Quarter-Finals. The top two teams in the other divisions plus the third place team in the division having the top seed qualifies for the post-season. All playoff rounds will be a single elimination matches.

Quarter-Finals

Semi-Finals

3rd Place Game

Final

Awards

Individual Awards

All-League First Team

All-League Second Team

References

External links
MASL2 official website

Major Arena Soccer League
 
Major Arena Soccer League